Avalon Hill's Diplomacy is a strategy video game developed by Meyer/Glass Interactive and published by Hasbro Interactive under the MicroProse brand name in 1999. It is based on the strategic board game Diplomacy.

Reception

The game received unfavorable reviews according to the review aggregation website GameRankings.

References

External links
 

1999 video games
MicroProse games
Turn-based strategy video games
Video games based on board games
Video games developed in the United States
Video games set in Europe
Windows games
Windows-only games
Wargaming Chicago-Baltimore